The John A. Bagley House, located at 155 N. 5th St. in Montpelier in Bear Lake County, Idaho, is a Queen Anne-style house built in 1902.  It was listed on the National Register of Historic Places in 1978.

It is a three-story house with a pedimented porch.  It has an octagonal corner tower and a hipped roof with abbreviated gables.

A third-floor room is decorated by murals by Joseph Phelps, an artist who became accomplished at a young age.

References

Houses on the National Register of Historic Places in Idaho
Queen Anne architecture in Idaho
Houses completed in 1902
Bear Lake County, Idaho